Oz is an American drama television series which was produced and broadcast by premium cable network HBO from 1997 to 2003. The series has been successful with many award associations, in particular, the American Latino Media Arts Awards (known as the ALMA Awards), the Casting Society of America's Artios Awards, the CableACE Awards, the Online Film & Television Association Awards and the International Press Academy's Satellite Awards. It has never been the recipient of any major awards, however, it has been nominated two Primetime Emmy Awards for Outstanding Guest Actor in a Drama Series and Outstanding Casting for a Series, as well as garnering several nominations at the NAACP Image Awards.  

Rita Moreno is the most nominated actress of the series, with a total of four wins out of twelve nominations. Other successful recipients include Lauren Vélez, Ernie Hudson, Eamonn Walker and Christopher Meloni.

Primetime Emmy Awards

ALMA Awards

Artios Awards
The Artios Awards are presented by the Casting Society of America.

CableACE Awards

Il Festival Nazionale del Doppiaggio Voci nell'Ombra

Edgar Awards
The Edgar Awards are presented by the Mystery Writers of America.

GLAAD Media Awards

NAACP Image Awards

OFTA Awards
The OFTA Awards are presented by the Online Film & Television Association.

PGA Television Awards
The PGA Television Awards are presented by the Producers Guild of America.

Satellite Awards
The Satellite Awards are presented by the International Press Academy.

Writers Guild of America Awards
The Writers Guild of America Awards are presented by Writers Guild of America, East.

Notes

References

Lists of awards by television series